There was no international cricket in the 1942–43 season due to Second World War. Domestic cricket went ahead in India with the Ranji Trophy being won by Baroda.

See also
 Cricket in World War II

References

International cricket competitions by season
1942 in cricket
1943 in cricket